This is a list of the (43) officially named waterfalls found in the state of Alaska in the United States,
according to the United States Geological Survey Geographic Names Information System.

List of waterfalls

References

General references

Waterfalls
Alaska